The 510th Fighter Squadron is part of the 31st Operations Group at Aviano Air Base, Italy.  It is a combat-ready F-16CM fighter squadron prepared to deploy and fly combat sorties as tasked by NATO and US combatant commanders.

The squadron was first activated as the 625th Bombardment Squadron in 1943, changing to the 510th Fighter-Bomber Squadron a few months later.  After training in the United States, it moved to England in March 1944, helping prepare for Operation Overlord by attacking targets in France.   Following D-Day, the squadron moved to the continent, providing close air support for Allied forces.  The squadron earned a Distinguished Unit Citation and was cited in the Order of the Day by the Belgian Army.  After V-E Day the squadron returned to the United States and was inactivated at the port of embarkation.

The squadron was activated again in 1952, when it replaced an Air National Guard squadron that had been mobilized for the Korean War.  It trained for fighter bomber operations until inactivating in 1958.  A year later, it was activated in the Philippines as the 510th Tactical Fighter Squadron.  The squadron returned to the United States in 1964, but soon deployed back to the Pacific, moving to Vietnam in 1965, and engaging in combat until inactivating in 1969 as the United States began withdrawing forces from Vietnam.

The squadron was activated with Fairchild Republic A-10 Thunderbolt IIs in 1978 as the 81st Fighter Wing doubled its tactical strength.  It moved to Germany in 1992 and was inactivated there in 1994.  A few weeks later, the squadron was reactivated in its current role.

Mission
The 510th performs strategic attack, air interdiction, combat search and rescue, close air support, and forward air control-airborne forces missions.    The squadron employs a full range of precision ordnance.

History

World War II
The squadron was originally activated at Drew Field, Florida on 1 March 1943 as the 625th Bombardment Squadron, one of the four original squadrons of the 405th Bombardment Group.  It was initially equipped with Douglas A-24 Banshees and Bell P-39 Airacobras.  Although retaining the same mission and equipment, in August the squadron was renamed the 510th Fighter-Bomber Squadron.  The following month, it moved to Walterboro Army Air Field, South Carolina, where it began to fly the Republic P-47 Thunderbolts, with which it would be equipped for the rest of World War II.  On 14 February 1944, the 510th left its training base for the European Theater of Operations.

The squadron arrived at its first station in the theater, RAF Christchurch, England in early March 1944 and flew its first combat mission the following month.  It dropped the "bomber" portion of its designation in May, but retained the fighter bomber mission.  The 510th helped prepare for Operation Overlord, the invasion of Normandy, by striking military airfields, and lines of communication, particularly bridges and railroad marshalling yards.  On D-Day, it flew combat patrols in the vicinity of Brest, France, and in the following days flew armed reconnaissance missions over Normandy.

Toward the end of June, the squadron moved to Picauville Airfield, France, and for the rest of the war concentrated on providing close air support for ground forces.  It supported Operation Cobra, the breakout at Saint Lo in July with attacks on military vehicles and artillery positions.  The squadron engaged and destroyed a German armored column near Avranches, France, on 29 July 1944.  After immobilizing leading and trailing elements of the 3-mile (4.8 km) long column, the rest of the tanks and trucks were systematically destroyed with multiple sorties. Its operations from D-Day through September 1944 supporting the liberation of Belgium earned the squadron a citation in the Order of the Day of the Belgian Army.  The squadron received a Distinguished Unit Citation for action on 24 September 1944 when the 4th Armored Division experienced a counterattack by enemy forces and urgently needed air support.  Elements of the 405th Group attacked the enemy armor despite an 800-foot ceiling that forced attacks to be made from low level in the face of intense flak.  A second group element was unable to locate the tank battle because of the adverse weather, but located a reinforcing column of armor and trucks, causing major damage.  A third element attacked warehouses and other buildings in the vicinity that were being used by the enemy.

The squadron flew its last combat mission of the war on 8 May 1945. It was credited with the destruction of 30 enemy aircraft. It briefly served in the occupation forces at AAF Station Straubing, but by 8 July was mostly a paper unit.  Its remaining personnel returned to the United States in October and the squadron was inactivated upon arrival at the port of embarkation.

Reactivation as a fighter bomber unit

The squadron returned to its designation as the 510th Fighter-Bomber Squadron and was activated at Godman Air Force Base, Kentucky on 1 December 1952, when it assumed the mission, personnel and F-47 Thunderbolt aircraft of the 149th Fighter-Bomber Squadron, a Virginia Air National Guard unit that had been called to active duty for the Korean War.  However, Godman was not suitable for jet fighter operations, and in April 1953, the squadron moved to Langley Air Force Base, Virginia as the Air Force prepared to transfer Godman to the Army.  After arriving at Langley, the squadron was able to upgrade to Republic F-84 Thunderjets, and later to North American F-100 Super Sabres.  The squadron became non-operational on 15 April 1958 and was inactivated with the rest of the 405th Wing in July 1958.

In 2014, a description of Stu Roosa's time as an astronaut described how the 510th had been charged to deploy to bases in West Germany to deliver nuclear weapons onto Soviet targets, eject, as fuel aboard their F-100s was not sufficient, and to escape and evade back to the West.

Vietnam War

The squadron was redesignated the 510th Tactical Fighter Squadron and activated in April 1959, when the 405th Fighter Wing replaced the 6200th Air Base Wing at Clark Air Base, Philippines.  The squadron assumed the mission, personnel and F-100 Super Sabres of the 72d Tactical Fighter Squadron, which was simultaneously inactivated. In 1959, the squadron deployed twice to Chiayi Air Base in Taiwan, and deployed a detachment to Tainan Air Base from December 1959 to November 1965, and in spring 1962, to Takhli Royal Thai Air Force Base as part of Joint Task Force 116.  The squadron left Clark in March 1964 for England Air Force Base, Louisiana, where the 3d Wing was reforming as a tactical fighter unit.

The squadron was not long at England before it returned to Clark, deploying there from May through August 1965, attached to its old headquarters, the 405th Fighter Wing.  It was back in Louisiana for less than four months, for, in November it moved to Bien Hoa Air Base, South Vietnam as the 3d Wing replaced the 6251st Tactical Fighter Wing there. During its time at Bien Hoa, it frequently came under attack by Viet Cong rocket and mortar attacks.  The squadron supported numerous ground operations with strike missions against enemy fortifications, supply areas, lines of communication and personnel, in addition to suppressing fire in landing areas. Along with the other F-100 squadrons at Bien Hoa, the squadron was frequently tasked with providing cover for Operation Ranch Hand missions flying from the base.

The squadron was deployed to Tainan Air Base, Taiwan from November 1965 to August 1967.

The 510th flew over 27,200 combat missions in Southeast Asia. In November 1969, the unit inactivated and its aircraft were distributed to other units in Vietnam.

Fighter operations in Europe

A-10 "Warthog" operations

The squadron was activated at RAF Bentwaters, England in October 1978 as the 81st Tactical Fighter Wing changed its mission to close air support and air interdiction, equipped with Fairchild Republic A-10 Thunderbolt IIs, and expanded from three to six operational squadrons. The squadron participated in joint and combined exercises with American and British ground forces and periodically deployed to designated wartime operating bases. The squadron deployed aircraft and personnel to Incirlik Air Base, Turkey for Operation Provide Comfort to support Kurdish relief in Northern Iraq from 6 September to 10 December 1991, 8 April to 10 June 1992, and from 6 August to 30 October 1992.

In the middle of this last deployment, on 1 October 1992, the squadron was reassigned to the 52d Operations Group at Spangdahlem Air Base, Germany.  In January 1993, it moved to Spangdahlem and joined its parent group. During 1993 and 1994, the 510th flew more than 1,700 combat sorties from Aviano Air Base, Italy, in support of Operation Deny Flight. The squadron continued its attack mission until inactivating in March 1994.

F-16 "Viper" operations
The 510th was reactivated at Aviano Air Base, Italy on 1 July 1994 as the 510th Fighter Squadron.  The squadron was equipped with General Dynamics F-16 Fighting Falcons made available from the 512th Fighter Squadron at Ramstein Air Base, Germany, which was inactivating as the 86th Fighter Wing became an airlift unit.  The 510th, during Operation Deliberate Force, the 1995 NATO intervention in Bosnia, was the first F-16 Block 40 squadron to drop a laser-guided bomb.  It also made the first combat use of night vision goggles in an F-16 during Operation Deliberate Guard, a follow up operation.  It was also one of the first F-16 units to become Forward Air Controllers (Airborne), and were the first controllers to employ the F-16 in combat.

In October 1998, the squadron deployed its F-16s to Incirlik Air Base, Turkey to fly in support of Operation Northern Watch.  In Operation Allied Force, the air war over Serbia, the 510th flew more combat missions than any other F-16 squadron.  Subsequently, the squadron was the first Aviano fighter squadron to deploy to Operation Southern Watch in June 2000.  During those deployments the squadron engaged in combat operations over Iraq in both surface attack and combat search and rescue.  From September to December 2002, the Buzzards returned to Operation Southern Watch and dropped 136,508 pounds of ordnance over Iraq to include the first use of the GBU-31A Joint Direct Attack Munition in F-16CG combat.

Lineage
 Constituted as the 625th Bombardment Squadron (Dive) on 4 February 1943
 Activated on 1 March 1943
 Redesignated: 510th Fighter-Bomber Squadron on 10 August 1943
 Redesignated: 510th Fighter-Bomber Squadron, Single Engine on 20 August 1943
 Redesignated: 510th Fighter Squadron, Single Engine on 30 May 1944
 Inactivated on 27 October 1945
 Redesignated 510th Fighter-Bomber Squadron on 15 October 1952
 Activated on 1 December 1952
 Inactivated on 1 July 1958
 Redesignated 510th Tactical Fighter Squadron on 11 March 1959
 Activated on 9 April 1959
 Inactivated on 15 November 1969
 Activated on 1 October 1978
 Inactivated on 1 February 1994
 Redesignated 510th Fighter Squadron on 23 March 1994
 Activated on 1 July 1994

Assignments
 405th Bombardment Group (later 405th Fighter-Bomber Group, 405th Fighter Group), 1 March 1943 – 27 October 1945
 405th Fighter-Bomber Group, 1 December 1952
 405th Fighter-Bomber Wing, 8 October 1957 – 1 July 1958
 405th Fighter Wing, 9 April 1959 (attached to Joint Task Force 116 16 May–8 June 1962)
 3d Tactical Fighter Wing, 16 March 1964 – 15 November 1969 (attached to 405th Fighter Wing c. 8 May–17 August 1965) 
 81st Tactical Fighter Wing, 1 October 1978
 52d Operations Group, 1 October 1992 – 1 February 1994
 31st Operations Group, 1 July 1994 – present

Stations

 Drew Field, Florida, 1 March 1943 (1943)
 Walterboro Army Air Field, South Carolina, 13 September 1943 – 14 February 1944
 RAF Christchurch (AAF-416), England, 6 March–22 June 1944
 Picauville Airfield, (A-8), France, 30 June 1944
 Saint-Dizier Airfield (A-64), France, 11 September 1944 
 Ophoven Airfield (Y-32), Belgium, 6 February 1945
 Kitzingen Airfield (R-6), Germany, 23 April 1945
 AAF Station Straubing (R-68), Germany, 14 May–2 July 1945
 Camp Kilmer, New Jersey, 25–27 October 1945
 Godman Air Force Base, Kentucky, 1 December 1952
 Langley Air Force Base, Virginia, 17 April 1953 – 1 July 1958

 Clark Air Base, Luzon, Philippines, 9 April 1959 – 14 March 1964 (deployed to Chiayi Air Base, Taiwan 1–8 July, 2–12 November 1959; Takhli Royal Thai Air Force Base, Thailand 11 May–8 June 1962)
 England Air Force Base, Louisiana, 16 March 1964 – 7 November 1965 (deployed to Clark Air Base, Philippines 8 May–20 August 1965)
 Bien Hoa Air Base, South Vietnam, 8 November 1965 – 15 November 1969
 RAF Bentwaters, England, 1 October 1978
 Spangdahlem Air Base, Germany, 4 January 1993 – 1 February 1994
 Aviano Air Base, Italy, 1 July 1994 – present

Aircraft

 Douglas A-24 Banshee (1943)
 Bell P-39 Airacobra (1943)
 Republic P-47 Thunderbolt (1943–1945)
 Republic F-84F Thunderstreak (1953–1956)

 North American F-100 Super Sabre (1959–1969)
 Fairchild Republic A-10 Thunderbolt II (1979–1994)
 General Dynamics F-16 Fighting Falcon (1994 – present)

Awards and campaigns

See also

 List of United States Air Force fighter squadrons
 List of F-100 units of the United States Air Force 
 General Dynamics F-16 Fighting Falcon operators

References

Notes
 Explanatory notes

 Citations

Bibliography

External links
 510th Fighter Squadron

510
Fighter squadrons of the United States Army Air Forces